Dipendra Prasad (born 1960) is an Indian mathematician.  He is a professor of mathematics at the Indian Institute of Technology Bombay. He is a number theorist known for his work in the areas of automorphic representations and the Gan–Gross–Prasad conjecture. He is currently the president of Commission for Developing Countries (CDC) of International Mathematics Union (2018–2022) and of Indian Math Society (2021–2022).

Two of his siblings, Gopal Prasad and Shrawan Kumar, are also mathematicians.

Education
Prasad obtained his bachelor's degree from the St. Xavier's College, Mumbai in 1978 before moving to the Indian Institute of Technology Kanpur for a Masters which he completed in 1980. From 1980–1985, Prasad worked as a research scholar at the Tata Institute of Fundamental Research, Mumbai (TIFR Mumbai). He then completed his PhD under the supervision of Benedict Gross at Harvard, in 1989.

Career
From 1989–1997, Prasad was a research assistant, fellow, and then reader at TIFR Mumbai. From 1992–1993, Prasad was a member of the Institute for Advanced Study. From 1994–2004, Prasad was an associate professor and then full professor at the Harish-Chandra Research Institute in Allahabad. From 2004 until 2019, Prasad was a professor at TIFR Mumbai. In 2019, Prasad moved to the Indian Institute of Technology Bombay.

Awards
In recognition of his contributions, the Government of India awarded him the Shanti Swarup Bhatnagar Prize in mathematical sciences for 2002. Apart from that he holds JC Bose fellowship awarded by the Department of Science and Technology, New Delhi. He is also a recipient of the Swarna Jayanti Fellowship in 1999. He was Invited Speaker on the International Congress of Mathematicians 2018 in Rio de Janeiro in Section 7 (Lie Groups and Generalizations) with the talk 'Ext-analogues of branching laws'.

Selected publications

Awards and honours
 TWAS Prize, The World Academy of Sciences 
 Invited speaker at ICM(2018)
 Jean-Morlet Chair, Centre International de Rencontres Mathématiques (2016)
 Fellow, Indian National Science Academy (2003).
 Shanti Swarup Bhatnagar Prize for Science and Technology, 2002.
 Fellow of The National Academy of Sciences, India (1997).
 Fellow, Indian Academy of Sciences (1995).

References

External links
 

1960 births
Living people
20th-century Indian mathematicians
21st-century Indian mathematicians
Fellows of The National Academy of Sciences, India
Fellows of the Indian Academy of Sciences
Fellows of the Indian National Science Academy
Harvard University alumni
IIT Kanpur alumni
St. Xavier's College, Mumbai alumni
Academic staff of Tata Institute of Fundamental Research
Scientists from Maharashtra
People from Ghazipur
Recipients of the Shanti Swarup Bhatnagar Award in Mathematical Science